Haza Sahman is a sub-district located in Bani Matar District, Sana'a Governorate, Yemen. Haza Sahman had a population of 6210  according to the 2004 census.

References 

Sub-districts in Bani Matar District